Ust-Vaga is a rural locality (a village) in Bereznikovskoye Rural Settlement of Vinogradovsky District, Arkhangelsk Oblast, Russia. The population was 199 as of 2010.

Geography 
Ust-Vaga is located on the Vaga River, 18 km southeast of Bereznik (the district's administrative centre) by road. Zaborye is the nearest rural locality.

References 

Rural localities in Vinogradovsky District
Shenkursky Uyezd